Srednebeloye is a rural locality (a selo) and the administrative center of Novoivanovsky Selsoviet of Ivanovsky District, Amur Oblast, Russia. The population was 716 as of 2018. There are 11 streets.

Geography 
Srednebeloye is located on the left bank of the Belaya River, 50 km north of Ivanovka (the district's administrative centre) by road. Srednebelaya is the nearest rural locality.

References 

Rural localities in Ivanovsky District, Amur Oblast